was the lead ship of the four-member  of heavy cruisers of the Imperial Japanese Navy (IJN), which were active in World War II. She was named after Mount Myōkō in Niigata Prefecture.

Background
Myōkō was approved under the 1922–1929 Fleet Modernization Program, as the first heavy cruiser to be built by Japan within the design constraints imposed by the Washington Naval Treaty, and was the first of the "10,000 ton" cruisers built by any nation. Naval architect Vice-admiral Yuzuru Hiraga was able to keep the design from becoming dangerously top-heavy in its early years by continually rejecting demands from the Imperial Japanese Navy General Staff for additional equipment to the upper decks. However, during modifications and rebuildings in the 1930s, the final displacement rose to 15,933 tons, well over the treaty limits.

Design

Propulsion was by 12 Kampon boilers driving four sets of single-impulse geared turbine engines, with four shafts turning three-bladed propellers. The ship was armored with a  side belt, and  armored deck; however, the bridge was not armored.

Myōkō’s main battery was ten 20 cm/50 3rd Year Type naval guns, the heaviest armament of any heavy cruiser in the world at the time, mounted in five twin turrets.  Her secondary armament included eight 12.7 cm/40 Type 89 naval guns in four twin mounts on each side, and 12 Type 93 Long Lance torpedoes in four triple launchers positioned below the aircraft deck. Myōkō was also equipped with an aircraft catapult and carried up to three floatplanes for scouting purposes.

Myōkō was laid down at the Yokosuka Naval Arsenal on 25 October 1924, launched and named on 16 April 1927 in a ceremony attended by Emperor Hirohito, and was commissioned into the Imperial Japanese Navy on 31 July 1929. Although the first ship in her class to be laid down, she was the third to be completed.

Myōkō was repeatedly modernized and upgraded throughout her career in order to counter the growing threat of air strikes. She eventually mounted 52 Type 96 25 mm AT/AA Gun guns and two  AA guns after her final upgrade.

Operational history

Early service

All of the Myōkō-class cruisers were assigned to the Sasebo Naval District, forming Sentai-4 of the IJN 3rd Fleet, and trained as a unit during the 1930s. During a naval review off Kobe on 26 October 1930 stack gases caused problems on the bridge, resulting in a lengthening of the forward smokestack by two meters.

During the First Shanghai Incident of February 1932, the cruisers escorted the transports conveying elements of the Imperial Japanese Army to the continent. In December 1932, the Myōkō class were placed in reserve as the new Takao class cruisers were commissioned, becoming the new Sentai-4, whereas the Myōkō-class ships were shifted to Sentai-5. Between 1933 and 1935, all Myōkō-class cruisers were retrofitted with their fixed triple torpedo launchers replaced by two quadruple rotatable launchers, and their secondary guns upgraded from 12 cm/45 10th Year Type naval guns to 12.7 cm/40 Type 89 naval gun. In 1935, Myōkō was damaged in a typhoon as part of the Fourth Fleet incident.

During the Second Sino-Japanese War Myōkō participated in the Amoy Operation from 10–12 May 1938 as flagship of Sentai-9 of the IJN 5th Fleet along with the Hainan Island Operation in February 1939.
  
A second reconstruction and retrofit was completed in April 1941, doubling the number of torpedoes to 16, adding another eight 25-mm anti-aircraft guns and bulges to the hull to improve stability.

Pacific War

Invasion of the Philippines
At the time of the attack on Pearl Harbor, Myōkō and Nachi formed Sentai-5 of the IJN 3rd Fleet. Sentai-5 was commanded by Rear Admiral Takeo Takagi and deployed from Palau cover for the landings of Japanese forces under "Operation M" — the invasion of the southern Philippine Islands. After covering the landings of Japanese forces at Legaspi on 11 December 1941. Myōkō and Nachi returned to Palau and were then reassigned to the Rear Admiral Raizō Tanaka, whose attack force covered landings at Davao on 19 December and Jolo on 24 December.

On 4 January 1942 Myōkō and the other vessels of Admiral Tanaka’s invasion force were attacked by United States Army Air Forces (USAAF) B-17 Flying Fortress bombers while at anchor at Davao. Myōkō was hit by one  bomb, causing only superficial damage, but she was drydocked at Sasebo Naval Arsenal for repairs.

Battle of the Java Sea
In the Battle of the Java Sea on 1 March 1942 Myōkō, Nachi and Haguro participated in the destruction of the last remaining Allied fleet units in the Netherlands East Indies. At 11:50, Myōkō,  and destroyers  and  opened fire on the damaged British heavy cruiser  and her escort of two destroyers. The 8-inch guns of Myōkō helped to sink Exeter and cripple the destroyer  which had to be scuttled.

Later in March, Myōkō received a refit at Sasebo Naval Arsenal. In April, she participated in the unsuccessful pursuit of the Doolittle raid task force.

Battle of the Coral Sea
In May, Myōkō was part of the Carrier Strike Force during the Operation Mo that resulted in the Tulagi invasion force and subsequently the Battle of the Coral Sea. It served as a flagship of Vice Admiral Takagi, who was in the overall command of the Carrier Strike Force. Shōkaku was damaged by American aircraft and Zuikaku lost most of her aircraft in the Battle of the Coral Sea, forcing the flotilla to withdraw without invading Port Moresby.

Battle of Midway
The Support Force returned to Sendai in northern Japan on 23 June without engaging the enemy in this battle, and Myōkō was sent out on 28 June as escort for the reinforcement convoy in the Aleutian Islands Campaign. Myōkō returned to Hashirajima on 12 July 1942.

The Solomon Islands campaign
On 11 October 1942 Myōkō sailed from Truk as part of the IJN 2nd Fleet. They were followed by Vice Admiral Chuichi Nagumo's Carrier Striking Force. The mission was the reinforcement and resupply of Japanese troops on the island of Guadalcanal, which had been invaded by American troops in August. Myōkō was attacked on 14 September by a flight of ten USAAF B-17 bombers, suffering light damage. On 15 October, she participated in a shore bombardment operation against the American-held Henderson Field together with Maya.

Between 31 January and 9 February 1943 Myōkō, after a refit at Sasebo, took part in the evacuation of Guadalcanal. The Japanese transports were successful in evacuating 11,700 troops from the island.

Later campaigns
In May 1943, Myōkō and Haguro sailed north to assist in the evacuation of Kiska. In June, they returned to Sasebo for another refit. Myōkō was equipped with four twin Type 96 25 mm AT/AA Gun mounts, and a Type 21 air search radar set was also installed.

In response to American carrier aircraft raiding in the Gilbert Islands, Myōkō sortied with Vice Admiral Jisaburō Ozawa's fleet to engage the American carriers. Despite extensive searches, this force failed to make contact with the American striking force and returned to Truk.

On 1 November, Myōkō and Haguro sailed south from Truk with two destroyers, escorting a supply convoy to Rabaul. There were 1,000 Japanese Army troops carried by four fast destroyer transports. The warships sailed ahead of the transports and engaged an American force in the Battle of Empress Augusta Bay at 12:50 on 3 November.

The American force of four light cruisers and eight destroyers sank Sendai with 6-inch (152 mm) gunfire. While avoiding the American gunfire, Myōkō collided with the destroyer . Hatsukaze fell behind the task force as it withdrew and was finished off by American gunfire. Haguro had received minor damage in the action, and the American destroyer  was crippled by a Long Lance torpedo.

On 17 November, Myōkō arrived at Sasebo for another refit. Eight single-mount 25 mm AA guns were added, bringing the total to 24 guns. In January, Myōkō (with Tone and two destroyers) made an uneventful transport run from Truk to Kavieng and back. On 10 February, while sailing from Truk to Palau with Atago and Chōkai and eight destroyers, Myōkō was attacked by the submarine . The submarine fired four torpedoes, but all missed.

In March, Myōkō and the destroyer  escorted an empty tanker convoy from Palau to Borneo. On 6 April, Myōkō was attacked by the submarine . She fired all six bow torpedo tubes, but missed. The submarine  also spotted Myōkō but was unable to maneuver into position for an attack.

Battle of the Philippine Sea
In June 1944, Myōkō participated in the Battle of the Philippine Sea. The Japanese fleet sailed from its anchorage at Tawi Tawi in response to the American invasion of the Marianas Islands. The Japanese high command was aware that American heavy bombers, based in the Marianas, could reach factories and shipyards in the Japanese home islands. This battle was later called the "Great Marianas Turkey Shoot" by American sailors, because over 300 Japanese carrier aircraft were shot down in a single day on 19 June.

Battle of Leyte Gulf
Myōkō participated in the Battle of Leyte Gulf as part of Vice Admiral Takeo Kurita's First Mobile Striking Force (Center Force) consisting of four battleships and ten cruisers. As the Center Force tried to force a passage through the Sibuyan Sea it was spotted and attacked by US Task Force 38. Although most airstrikes concentrated on the battleship , Myōkō was hit by a torpedo aft on the starboard side, which damaged her starboard screws. After temporary repairs she departed for Japan with a stop at Cam Ranh Bay.

En route to Cam Ranh Bay Myōkō was hit by one torpedo from a spread of six, fired by the submarine  at 17:35 on 13 December 1944 on her aft port side, blowing away her stern, and leaving her unable to steer. She went dead in the water. Despite the extensive damage to the aft, one port screw remained operable and she could make . Unable to steer, she was towed by destroyer  (which assisted in damaging Bergall, which survived and returned to Fremantle) and several other ships to Singapore harbor for repairs; however, there were insufficient materials in Singapore to complete the repairs for both Myōkō and Takao, the latter which had been severely damaged by two submarine-launched torpedoes prior to the Sibuyan Sea battle.

Fate 

In February 1945, the harbor commander reported that Myōkō was irreparable at Singapore without more materials, and impossible to tow to Japan. He recommended that Myōkō be kept in Singapore as a floating anti-aircraft battery, and this suggestion was approved. Both Myōkō and Takao were targeted by British midget submarine attacks on 26 July, but survived the war.

References

Bibliography

External links

Imperial Japanese Navy at Combinedfleet.com
Action with USS Bergall and escape

Myōkō-class cruisers
Ships built by Yokosuka Naval Arsenal
1927 ships
Second Sino-Japanese War cruisers of Japan
World War II cruisers of Japan
Shipwrecks in the Strait of Malacca
Scuttled vessels
Maritime incidents in December 1944
Maritime incidents in 1946